Fritz Alberti (born Friedrich Wilhelm Alberti; 22 October 1877 – 15 September 1954) was a German actor.

Selected filmography

 People in Ecstasy (1921)
 The Other Woman (1924)
 The Blackguard (1925)
 Ship in Distress (1925)
 The Hanseatics (1925)
 Frisian Blood (1925)
 I Love You (1925)
 If Only It Weren't Love (1925)
 Vienna - Berlin (1926)
 The Sea Cadet (1926)
 Battle of the Sexes (1926)
 The Student of Prague (1926)
 White Slave Traffic (1926)
 The Woman's Crusade (1926)
 Café Elektric (1927)
 U-9 Weddigen (1927)
 The Impostor (1927)
 Aftermath (1927)
 The Sporck Battalion (1927)
 That Was Heidelberg on Summer Nights (1927)
 Docks of Hamburg (1928)
 Because I Love You (1928)
 The Gallant Hussar (1928)
 Rasputin (1928)
 Escape from Hell (1928)
 Five Anxious Days (1928)
 The Lady and the Chauffeur (1928)
 Circumstantial Evidence (1929)
 Inherited Passions (1929)
 The Woman of Yesterday and Tomorrow (1928)
 The Ship of Lost Souls (1929)
 Misled Youth  (1929)
 It's You I Have Loved (1929)
 The Adjutant of the Czar (1929)
 Darling of the Gods (1930)
 Oh Those Glorious Old Student Days (1930)
 Love's Carnival (1930)
 The Dreyfus Case (1930)
 Two People (1930)
 The White Devil (1930)
 1914 (1931)
 Grock (1931)
 The Theft of the Mona Lisa (1931)
 The Battle of Bademunde (1931)
 Student Life in Merry Springtime (1931)
 Death Over Shanghai (1932)
 The First Right of the Child (1932)
 Marshal Forwards (1932)
 Tannenberg (1932)
 The Secret of Johann Orth (1932)
 The House of Dora Green (1933)
 The Voice of Love (1934)
 The Sporck Battalion (1934)
 Elisabeth and the Fool (1934)
 The Grand Duke's Finances (1934)

References

External links
 

1877 births
1954 deaths
German male film actors
German male silent film actors
People from Hanau
20th-century German male actors
Nazi Party members